Pago Veiano is a comune (municipality) in the Province of Benevento in the Italian region Campania, located about 70 km northeast of Naples and about 15 km northeast of Benevento.

Pago Veiano borders the following municipalities: Paduli, Pesco Sannita, Pietrelcina, San Giorgio La Molara, San Marco dei Cavoti.

References

External links
 Official website

Cities and towns in Campania